Bruce MacDonald  may refer to:

 Bruce MacDonald (athlete) (1927-2020), American Olympic racewalker
 Bruce MacDonald (public servant), Australian public servant
 Bruce MacDonald (sailor) (born 1960), Canadian Olympic sailor
 Bruce E. MacDonald (born 1956), American admiral
 David Bruce MacDonald, Canadian political scientist

See also
 Bruce McDonald (disambiguation)